Babine Lake Marine Provincial Park is a provincial park in British Columbia, Canada. The park was established by Order-in-Council in 1993, comprising two sites at Pendleton Bay totalling . Three more sites were added in 2001, Hook (Deep) Bay, Pierre Creek, Pinkut Creek and Sandpoint.

Climate

Sites

Pendleton Bay sites -   and 
Smithers Landing site -. 
Hook (Deep) Bay site - 
Pierre Creek site - 
Sandpoint site - 
Pinkut Creek site -

References

Provincial parks of British Columbia
Bulkley Valley
1993 establishments in British Columbia
Protected areas established in 1993
Marine parks of Canada